Gamiani, or Two Nights of Excess is a French erotic novel first published in 1833. Its authorship is anonymous, but it is believed to have been written by Alfred de Musset and the lesbian eponymous heroine a portrait of his lover, George Sand. It became a bestseller among nineteenth century erotic literature.

The novel was illustrated with unsigned lithographs whose authorship remains unknown. They have been attributed to Achille Devéria and Octave Tassaert, among others.

References

External links

1833 novels
Novels by Alfred de Musset
French erotic novels
French LGBT novels
Works published anonymously